Joel West (born April 6, 1975) is an American actor and model.

Biography
His mother, Jan Gipple, is a veterinary technician. She and his father, Rob West, divorced in 1989.
He was discovered by a photographer at a "Dairy Queen" and he has worked for Calvin Klein, Versace, and Hugo Boss, and has become one of the elite models in male model industry.

Early life

Film career

He is signed to famous Nous Model Management in Los Angeles.

Model career

He is signed to small boutique agency Hello Models NYC in New York City.

Filmography

References

External links
 Collection
 

1975 births
Living people
Male models from Iowa
American male television actors
Buena Vista University alumni
People from Indianola, Iowa
Male actors from Iowa